The southern torrent frog (Arthroleptides yakusini) is a species of frog in the family Petropedetidae endemic to Tanzania, where it is found in the Uluguru, Udzungwa, and Mahenge Mountains. Frogs from the Nguru Mountains may represent an unnamed species.

A. yakusini is associated with rocky streams in montane forests. It appears to tolerate some degradation of the forest. Eggs are laid on rocks over which water is trickling, close to torrential streams and waterfalls. The larvae remain attached to the rocks, developing out of water.

References

Arthroleptides
Amphibians of Tanzania
Endemic fauna of Tanzania
Taxonomy articles created by Polbot
Amphibians described in 2002